Peniophorella is a genus of fungus belonging to the Agaricomycetes class; it has not been assigned to an order or a family.  It contains 27 species.  The genus was documented in 1889 by Finnish mycologist Petter Adolf Karsten.

References

Agaricomycetes
Agaricomycetes genera